William Kempe ( 1560–  1603), commonly referred to as Will Kemp, was an English actor and dancer specialising in comic roles and best known for having been one of the original stage actors in early dramas by William Shakespeare. Roles associated with his name may include the great comic creation, Falstaff, and his contemporaries considered him the successor to the great clown of the previous generation, Richard Tarlton.

Kempe's success and influence was such that in December 1598 he was one of a core of five actor-shareholders in the Lord Chamberlain's Men alongside Shakespeare and Richard Burbage, but in a short time (possibly after a disagreement among the members of the troupe) he parted company with the group. Despite his fame as a performer and subsequent intent to continue his career, he appears to have died unregarded and in poverty circa 1603.

Life

Kemp's parentage is unknown, though it has been conjectured that, despite his plebeian performance persona, he was linked in some way to the Kempes of Ollantighe, near Ashford in Kent, who were a wealthy Catholic dynasty. Sir Thomas Kempe (1517–1591) did indeed have a son named William; however, the claim that this William Kempe was the actor cannot be correct, since he was buried at Wye church on 27 March 1597 (Honneyman, 125–9; Bannerman, 3; private information, A. Findlay) . Nonetheless, this putative connection might help explain the otherwise surprising story—dramatized in the play The Travailes of the Three English Brothers (1607) by Day, Rowley, and Wilkins—that when William Kemp the actor was in Italy in 1601 he had an encounter with the celebrated traveller Sir Anthony Shirley: for Sir Anthony and his two equally famous brothers were related to the Ollantighe Kempes through their mother, who was Sir Thomas Kempe's daughter. Possibly, then, the actor had some tie of kinship to Ollantighe, at an outlying point on the family tree; or perhaps in recommending himself to Shirley he was just opportunistically taking advantage of the name he shared with Shirley's mother.

Kempe is usually given an approximate birth year of 1560. He first enters the historical record as a performer with Leicester's Men at Leicester House in May 1585 and continued in this service after Leicester's departure for the Low Countries to take part in the Eighty Years' War. Leicester's nephew, Philip Sidney, sent letters home by way of a man he called "Will, my Lord of Lester's jesting player" and it is now generally accepted this was Kempe. Sidney complained in a letter to Francis Walsingham that "Will" had delivered the letters to Lady Leicester rather than Sidney's wife, Frances Walsingham. After a brief return to England, Kempe accompanied two other future Lord Chamberlain's Men, George Bryan and Thomas Pope, to Elsinore where he entertained Frederick II of Denmark.

Kempe's whereabouts in the later 1580s are not known, but that his fame as a performer was growing during this period is indicated by Thomas Nashe's An Almond for a Parrot (1590). Nashe dedicated this work to Kempe, calling him "vicegerent general to the ghost of Dick Tarlton." Similarly, the title-page of the quarto of A Knack to Know a Knave advertises Kempe's "merriments". (Because title-pages were a means to draw attention to a book, the mention of Kempe suggests that he had become an attraction in his own right.) Critics have generally viewed the scene in which Kempe performs as rather flat (Collier, 97) and it is assumed that the scene provided a framework within which Kempe could improvise. Entries in the Stationers' Register indicate that three jigs (short comic plays) perhaps written by Kempe were published between 1591 and 1595. Two of these have survived.

By 1592 Kempe was one of Lord Strange's Men, listed in the Privy Council authorisation for that troupe to play seven miles out of London. In 1594, upon the dissolution of Strange's Men, Kempe, along with Burbage and Shakespeare, joined the Lord Chamberlain's Men and remained with that company until early 1599, when a still-unclear sequence of events removed him from the company. Although he had been a sharer in the plans to construct the Globe Theatre, he appeared in no productions in the new theatre, which was open by mid-1599, and evidence from Shakespeare's Henry V, in which there is no promised continued role for Falstaff, and Hamlet, containing its famous complaint at improvisational clowning (Act 3, Scene 2), indicates some of the circumstances in which Kempe may have been dropped. Kemp played his last role for Shakespeare in 1598.

Final years

After his departure from the Chamberlain's Men in early 1599, Kempe continued to pursue his career as a performer. In February and March 1600, he undertook what he would later call his "Nine Days Wonder", in which he morris danced from London to Norwich (a distance of about 110 miles or 177 km) in a journey which took him nine days spread over several weeks, often amid cheering crowds. Later that year he published a description of the event to prove to doubters that it was true. However, his activities after this famous stunt are as obscure as his origins. On evidence from The Travels of the Three English Brothers, he is assumed to have made another European tour, perhaps reaching Italy, but by 1601 he was borrowing money from Philip Henslowe and had joined Worcester's Men. The last undoubted mention of him occurs in Henslowe's diary in late 1602.

Parish records record the death of "Kempe, a man" in St. Saviour, Southwark, late in 1603. While this is not necessarily the comedian, the record fits his departure from the documentary record.

Performance style
In his time, Kempe was as famous for his stage jigs as for his acting in regular drama. The jig, a kind of rustic cousin to commedia dell'arte, featured as many as five performers in a partially improvised song-and-dance routine. Jigs had plots, often bawdy, but the emphasis was on dancing and physical comedy. Two of Kempe's jigs survive in English, and two more in German. Examples of the jigs may be seen in the manuscript collection of John Dowland (now in the Cambridge University Library). A famous 17th century jig called Kemp's Jig was named after Will Kempe and was published in the first book of John Playford's The English Dancing Master of 1651. The tune has received a number of modern renditions, including those by Jan Akkerman and Gryphon.

As an actor, Kempe is certainly associated with two roles: Dogberry in Much Ado About Nothing and Peter in Romeo and Juliet. (In the quarto text of the latter, and in both quarto and First Folio text of the former, he is identified in speech prefixes and stage directions.) From these hints, a list of Kempe's parts has been deduced which, if conjectural, is not improbable: Costard in Love's Labours Lost, Bottom in A Midsummer Night's Dream, Lancelot Gobbo in The Merchant of Venice, and Cob in Ben Jonson's Every Man in His Humour. Falstaff is a more ambiguous case. Though Falstaff presents some features of an Elizabethan dramatic clown, his character is higher in class and more complex than the other roles with which Kempe is associated.

In period fiction
Kempe appears as a character in The Return from Parnassus, or The Scourge of Simony, possibly written during his lifetime or very shortly after his death. In it he praises Shakespeare for outdoing university-educated playwrights.

In modern fiction

Film and TV
In the 1978 TV series Will Shakespeare Kempe is portrayed by Derek Royle as an oafish alcoholic. He is ousted from the troupe and replaced by Robert Armin when they think he has betrayed their involvement in the Essex Rebellion. In fact Armin is the informer, who has framed Kempe to replace him.
In the 1998 John Madden film Shakespeare in Love, he is played by Patrick Barlow.
In 2005's TV-film A Waste of Shame he is portrayed by John Voce.
In the 2007 Doctor Who episode "The Shakespeare Code", Kempe is played by David Westhead.
In the 2016 BBC sitcom Upstart Crow, Kempe is played by Spencer Jones as a parody of modern comedian Ricky Gervais.
In the 2017 television series Will, he is portrayed by William Houston.

Literature
Kempe is the subject of Paul Aldred's 2022 novel for young adults Will Kempe, Clown, covering his last three years with the Lord Chamberlain's Company.
Kempe is a key character in Kevin Sylvester's 2015 novel for young adults Neil Flambé and the Bard's Banquet, published by Simon & Schuster Books
Kempe appears in Ann Young's 2002 novel for young adults The Nine Days Wonder, published by East Hall Press.
In Neil Gaiman's 1991 graphic novel The Sandman: Dream Country, Kempe is depicted in the issue A Midsummer Night's Dream, a short story about Shakespeare's first performance of the play.
Kempe also appears in King of Shadows, a 1999 children's fiction book which shows Kempe as a clown dancing a Nine Days' Morris.
In Harry Turtledove's alternate history 2002 novel Ruled Britannia Kempe is one of the main characters. His off-stage personality is indistinguishable from the characters he plays on stage, and his antics provide much of the humour in the novel, which is set during a time of grim peril.
In J. B. Cheaney's 2004 novel The True Prince along with more of the Lord Chamberlain's Men.
Kempe's Jig is referenced in Geoffrey Hill's poem "After Reading Children of Albion (1969)" from his A Treatise of Civil Power, published in 2007.

Stage

In 1973 Chris Harris began touring in "Kemp's Jig" a one-man humorous show describing Kemp's life and the Nine Days' Wonder.  The play toured globally, with its performance at the National Theatre televised for LWT's Aquarius programme.  In 2019 Blue Fire Theatre Company took over the production, which continues to tour with Steve Taylor playing Kemp.

 Kempe was the title character in Dan Roentsch's play Will Kemp.

William Gibson depicts Kempe as a moody tragedian in his 1968 play A Cry of Players, a significant departure from Kempe's actual performance style.

In 2008, comedian Tim FitzHigham re-enacted Kemp's Nine Day's Wonder by Morris dancing from London to Norwich, forming the basis of his play The Bard's Fool, performed at the Edinburgh Fringe.

In 2021, Tortive Theatre launched a new one-actor play about the life and death of William Kempe, written by T.G Hofman, at the Edinburgh Fringe. Shakespeare's Fool starred Robin Leetham as Kempe and was directed by Ben Humphrey. The show started touring the UK in 2022.

Concerts
During the COVID-19 Lockdowns 2020–2021, Hexachordia, a Musical trio created  KEMP’S JIG - a fifty-five minute “Docu-Concert” following the exploits of the Shakespearean comic actor and available to view online.

Footnotes

References
 
 

Records of Early English Drama – Norwich 1540–1642, 1984, 114–115 [Norwich Mayors' Court Books XIII p. 418] – Record of payment to Kemp for his jig
 
Bald, R. C. "Leicester's Men in the Low Countries." Review of English Studies 19 (1943), 395–7.
Collier, J. P. Lives of the Original Actors in Shakespeare's Plays. London: Shakespeare Society, 1853.
Nielsen, James. "Kempe at the Globe." Shakespeare Quarterly 44 (1993), 466–468.
Nunzeger, Edwin. A Dictionary of Actors and of Other Persons Associated With the Public Presentation of Plays in England Before 1642. New Haven: Yale University Press, 1929.
Shapiro, James. 1599, A Year in the Life of William Shakespeare, "Prologue" and Chapter 1, "A Battle of Wills". (2005), 1–49.
Wright, Louis. "Will Kemp and Commedia dell'Arte." Modern Language Notes 41 (1926), 516–520.

External links 
 
 
 Text of Kempe's Nine Days Wonder at Project Gutenberg.

English male stage actors
English male dancers
English clowns
English male Shakespearean actors
16th-century births
Year of birth unknown
Place of birth missing
17th-century English male actors
Burials at Southwark Cathedral
1603 deaths
Date of death unknown
Place of death missing
16th-century English male actors
People associated with Shakespeare
Walkers of the United Kingdom
16th-century dancers